KENW (channel 3) is a PBS member television station in Portales, New Mexico, United States. Owned by the Eastern New Mexico University, it is sister to NPR member station KENW-FM (89.5 FM). Both stations share studios at the KENW Broadcast Center on South Avenue at the campus; the TV station's transmitter is located along State Road 88 (east of Portales).

History
The station signed on on September 1, 1974 as the first public television station in eastern New Mexico. For the first 14 years of its existence, it was the only PBS member station to indirectly serve both Amarillo and Midland-Odessa, although most public television programming in those areas was broadcast by the region's commercial television stations. This situation was remedied when KPBT-TV
and KACV-TV launched in 1986 and 1988, respectively.

Programming
This station is unique in that it provides local regional news to southeastern New Mexico with an entirely college student produced newscast entitled "News 3 New Mexico." The newscast includes hard news, local, and regional news pertinent to people in southeast New Mexico and rarely covers what a traditional college campus newscast covers.

Shows produced by KENW-TV include the nationally syndicated show Creative Living with Sheryl Borden, Report from Santa Fe hosted by Lorene Mills, Cultura, You Should Know (with host Don Criss), and Sportslook, a weekly regional sports show.

Creative Living with Sheryl Borden

Creative Living with Sheryl Borden is a KENW produced program airing on public television since 1976. It is a magazine-formatted program with cooking, sewing and craft tips hosted by Sheryl Borden. The program runs 30 minutes. It is taped at KENW-TV. As of 2018, the show is carried on more than 118 PBS stations in over 40 states as well as Canada, Guam and Puerto Rico.

Translators

References

External links 
Official site

PBS member stations
Television channels and stations established in 1974
Eastern New Mexico University
ENW (TV)
1974 establishments in New Mexico
First Nations Experience affiliates